Cyrtomorphus is a genus of pleasing fungus beetles (insects in the family Erotylidae). Species are found in the Far East Asia.

References

External links 

 Cyrtomorphus at insectoid.info

Erotylidae
Cucujoidea genera